The Land Before Time XIV: Journey of the Brave is a 2016 American direct-to-video animated film and the fourteenth and final film in The Land Before Time series. It is the first installment in the franchise to be released since 2007's The Wisdom of Friends, marking the longest gap between two films in the series. The film was directed by Davis Doi and written by Cliff Ruby and Elana Lesser. It was made available on DVD and Digital HD on February 2, 2016, with the DVD version exclusive to Walmart stores in North America until May 10, 2016, when it became available in other stores. The film features the voices of Damon Wayans Jr. and country singer Reba McEntire, who performs the song "Look for the Light". Like all other The Land Before Time movies, it is traditionally-animated.

Plot 
Littlefoot, a young Apatosaurus living in the verdant Great Valley, is eagerly awaiting the arrival of his father Bron, who returns to the valley with his herd once a year. However, he soon learns from a Nothronychus member of his dad's troupe named Wild Arms that his father became stranded in the wilderness when the fire mountain erupted, leaving the rest of the herd to go on without him. They ask Wild Arms for help, but he belligerently says no. The other grownups agree. After worrying about his father, Littlefoot sets out alone. However, the others soon catch up with him. They do fine at first, but run into the earth divide. It is suggested that they follow the Long Valley instead, but Littlefoot says that that will take too long, and that they must cross there. Luckily, they are able to knock down a tree, and get across.

After two close encounters with a duo of Yutyrannus, night falls and the children go to sleep. Meanwhile, the elder dinosaurs learn about their children's trek, and decide to go after them with two younger ones - Chomper and Ruby. They attempt to have Wild Arms guide them back to where Bron was last seen, but he faints at the mere sight of Chomper, a sharptooth, and has to be carried, leaving Chomper to lead the way with his nose. The next morning, and a disagreement between Littlefoot and Cera on which path to take causes Littlefoot to decide to go ahead alone. A sand cloud (sandstorm) then occurs, and Littlefoot is trapped in a cave, where he meets a Pteranodon named Etta, who knows his father. Meanwhile, Cera, Ducky, and Spike lose Petrie, who comes across a tribe of diggers. They soon find him, and they soon leave the diggers, who elect themselves a new leader.

Meanwhile, Etta tells Littlefoot what happened to Bron, and that he may well be dead. She also says that it was because Bron had rescued Wild Arms that he got into that mess. After many failed attempts to dig their way out of the cave, they head deeper into the cave itself, she sings a song to lead him on his way. The rest of the kids, meanwhile, run into a Carnotaurus, though Etta is able to hit a hole through the cave ceiling and help them get away where they reunite with Littlefoot who makes up with Cera for the argument. Etta eventually leads Littlefoot and his friends out of the cave, and to the fire mountain where they find Bron. It looks hopeless as he is surrounded by lava, and Bron tells them to go so they do not get hurt, but Littlefoot refuses.

Later, the grownups, plus Chomper and Ruby, come across the Carnotaurus. Chomper smells it and they are able to hide from it, but are nearly discovered due to Wild Arms cowering in fear and making noise. Just before the sharptooth discovers them, it is distracted by a flock of Archaeornithomimus. Back at the fire mountain, Etta and the kids spring into action to save Bron. They are able to halt the Flowing Fire by sending water onto it, and use a tree to free Bron, though the flowing fire returns and Littlefoot and his father are trapped on the other side. Bron scoops him up, however, and jumps across the lava, and right after, the adults, Chomper, and Ruby, find them. Reunited with his father and the rest of the herd led by Chomper back home to the Valley, the group extol the virtues of working together, and finding bravery through companionship.

Voice cast 

 Felix Avitia as Littlefoot
 Anndi McAfee as Cera and Petrie's Mother
 Aria Curzon as Ducky
 Jeff Bennett as Petrie
 Rob Paulsen as Spike
 Barry Bostwick as Grandpa Longneck (replaced the late Kenneth Mars) 
 Miriam Flynn as Grandma Longneck
 George Ball as Mr. Topps (replaced the late John Ingle)
 Issac Brown as Chomper
 Meghan Strange as Ruby and Ducky and Spike's Mother
 Scott Whyte as Bron
 Tony Amendola as the Narrator (replaced the late John Ingle) 
 Reba McEntire as Etta
 Damon Wayans Jr. as Wild Arms

Production 
News of a new Land Before Time movie was first revealed in a November 2014 Yahoo! Finance article detailing Universal Studios' future film plans, though no further information was given. A January 2015 interview with child actor Felix Avitia revealed that he had been cast as Littlefoot in the tentatively-titled The Land Before Time XIV: Journey of the Heart, which was planned for release later that year. The following July, the first trailer for the film was released on Rotten Tomatoes, revealing the movie's finalized title Journey of the Brave, along with a new release date on DVD and Digital HD on February 2, 2016. The North American DVD version would be available exclusively at Walmart and Walmart.com, and would be preceded by a Land Before Time compilation album featuring songs from the series on January 29, 2016 by Back Lot Music.

Journey of the Brave was directed by series newcomer Davis Doi and written by fellow series newcomers Cliff Ruby and Elana Lesser, with music by Land Before Time series veteran Michael Tavera. It features four sing-along songs, including "Look for the Light" performed by country singer Reba McEntire, who also provides the voice for the Pteranodon character Etta. McEntire finished recording her dialogue in August 2015, and later remarked on how the cast of characters "remind me a lot of my friends when I was a kid." Actor Damon Wayans, Jr. was also cast as the character Wild Arms.

Reception 

In its first week of release the film debuted at No. 11 on the top 20 Home Video titles. Common Sense Media rated the movie a 3 out of 5 stars, stating: "There's a gentle sweetness to this story which, when accompanied by four original upbeat songs, softens the danger and suspense that occur in the action sequences. Yes, the dinos do run into some fierce Sharpteeth creatures who chase them, and they do have mountains to climb and a sandstorm to outrun, and they find themselves on the brink of disaster several times, but for kids who are clear about the difference between make-believe and real, there is nothing truly scary or unsettling. The characters are original, quirky, and funny and have been well established in the earlier DVDs so that audiences, both old and new, will find them engaging. The addition of the voice talent of Reba McIntyre, who sings, and Damon Wayons, Jr., who jokes a lot, is another plus. A solid entry in the franchise."

References

External links 
 
 Official website

2010s American animated films
2016 direct-to-video films
2016 animated films
2016 films
Animated films about dinosaurs
Films about volcanoes
Direct-to-video sequel films
Films directed by Davis Doi
Films scored by Michael Tavera
The Land Before Time films
Universal Animation Studios animated films
Universal Pictures direct-to-video animated films
2010s children's animated films
2010s English-language films